Lake Vissi is a lake of Estonia. It's located in the Vissi village.

See also
List of lakes of Estonia

Vissi
Nõo Parish
Vissi